Encruzado is a white Portuguese wine grape grown primarily in the Dão DOC. It is mainly used as a blending grape. 

It is also known as Salgueirinho.

See also
List of Portuguese grape varieties

References

White wine grape varieties